Borkum Airfield  is an airfield serving Borkum, an island and a municipality in the Leer district in the German state of Lower Saxony.

Facilities
It has one asphalt-paved runway designated 13/31 which measures .

Airlines and destinations

The following airlines offer regular scheduled and charter flights at Borkum Airfield:

See also
 Transport in Germany
 List of airports in Germany

References

External links
 Official website
 

Airports in Lower Saxony
Borkum